The sapeh (sape' , sampek, sambe', sapek) is a traditional lute of the Kenyah and Kayan community who live in the longhouses that line the rivers of East Kalimantan and North Kalimantan, Indonesia and Northern part of Sarawak, Malaysia. Sape' are carved from a single bole of wood, with many modern instruments reaching over a metre in length.

Initially the sape was a fairly limited instrument with two strings and only three frets. Its use was restricted to a form of ritualistic music to induce trance. In the last century, the sape gradually became a social instrument to accompany dances or as a form of entertainment. Today, three, four or five-string instruments are used, with a range of more than three octaves.

Technically, the sape is a relatively simple instrument, with one string carrying the melody and the accompanying strings as rhythmic drones. In practice, the music is quite complex, with many ornamentations and thematic variations. There are two common modes, one for the men's longhouse dance and the other for the woman's longhouse dance. There also is a third rarely used mode. Sape music is usually inspired by dreams and there are over 35 traditional pieces with many variations. The overall repertoire is slowly increasing.

Sape' are still being made in Borneo, and modern innovations like electric sape' are common.

History
The history of sapeh starts from East Kalimantan (present day Indonesia) "It is said that according to the Dayak Kayaan mythology”, Sape' was created by a man who was stranded in an essay (a small island in the middle of a river). At that time the sampan karam (sink) in the  riam (waves). The person, whose identity has not been identified until now, along with his partner went down the river, and then sank. They were shipwrecked because they were unable to save the canoe from the cascade. One of them managed to escape to the essay. While the rest died from drowning and being carried away by the current.

While sleeping, between conscious and unconscious, he who survived heard the sound of the strings of stringed music so beautiful from the bottom of the river. The longer he heard the sound, the closer he felt to the source of the curious music. This he experienced as if he was getting inspiration from the ancestors of his ancestors. When he returned home, he tried to make a musical instrument and played it according to the lyrics of the song he heard when composing. From then on Sape' Kenyah began to be played and used as traditional music by the Dayak Kenyah tribe, to other Dayak Kenyah groups.

Image gallery

See also

 Sasando
 Cekuntrung
 Music of Indonesia

References

 World Instrument Gallery
 The Stringed Instrument Database
 ATLAS of Plucked Instruments

External links
News article about a woman who learned to play the Sapeh.
Video of musical duo playing both Malayan gambus (oud) and Sape. Sape part starts at 42 seconds.

Indonesian musical instruments
Malaysian musical instruments
String instruments